Back to the World is the fourth studio album by Curtis Mayfield, released in 1973 under Curtom Records. It peaked at number 16 on the Billboard 200 chart, as well as number 1 on the Top R&B Albums chart.

Track listing

Personnel
 Curtis Mayfield - guitar, vocals
 Phil Upchurch - guitar
 Joseph "Lucky" Scott - bass
 Rich Tufo - keyboards, organ, arrangements
 Henry Gibson - congas, percussion
 Quinton Joseph - drums

Credits adapted from liner notes.

 Curtis Mayfield – production
 Roger Anfinsen – engineering
 Glen Christensen – art direction
 Gary Wolkowitz – illustration
 Milton Sincoff – packaging
 Marv Stuart – management

Charts

Weekly charts

Year-end charts

See also
 List of Billboard number-one R&B albums of 1973

References

External links
 

1973 albums
Curtis Mayfield albums
Albums produced by Curtis Mayfield
Curtom Records albums